Ken Hardie  (born 1947) is a Canadian broadcaster and Liberal politician who was elected as a Member of Parliament in the House of Commons of Canada to represent the riding of Fleetwood—Port Kells during the 2015 federal election.

Hardie is a broadcaster and former spokesperson for TransLink and the Insurance Corporation of British Columbia. He attended the University of British Columbia and Simon Fraser University.

Electoral record

References

External links
 Official Website

1947 births
Living people
Members of the House of Commons of Canada from British Columbia
Liberal Party of Canada MPs
People from Surrey, British Columbia
Politicians from Edmonton
University of British Columbia alumni
Simon Fraser University alumni
Canadian public relations people
Canadian radio personalities
21st-century Canadian politicians